Keyla Ohs (born January 26, 1979) is a Canadian former competitive figure skater who competed in ladies singles. She is the 1998 Canadian national silver medalist.

Competitive highlights 
GP: Champions Series / Grand Prix

References 

1979 births
Canadian female single skaters
Living people
People from Port Alberni
Sportspeople from British Columbia